Old Custom House or similar may refer to:

Old Custom House (Cairo, Illinois)
Old Custom House (Yorktown, Virginia)
Old Custom House, Montreal
Old Customs House (Bangkok)
Old Customs House (Knoxville, Tennessee)
Old Customs House, Fremantle, Western Australia
Old Customhouse (Monterey, California)
Old Customshouse (Erie, Pennsylvania)
Old Customshouse (Wilmington, Delaware)
United States Customhouse and Post Office (Wiscasset, Maine), sometimes called Old Customhouse
Old Custom House, Dublin, Ireland

See also
Custom House (disambiguation)
Customhouse (disambiguation)
Old Customs Buildings, Mexico City